Barbon is a village and civil parish in the South Lakeland district of Cumbria, England. According to the 2001 census it had a population of 263, reducing to 236 at the 2011 Census. The church is dedicated to St Bartholomew. Barbon Beck flows through, and takes its name from, the village before flowing into the River Lune. The A683 road passes to the west of the village between Kirkby Lonsdale and Sedbergh. The village has been within the Yorkshire Dales National Park since 1 August 2016.

Description
The village was the childhood home of the poet Catherine Grace Godwin who died here in 1845.

Barbon is the location of Barbon Manor Speed Hillclimb, an event that runs up to three occasions each year, in May, June and July, on a driveway that runs through Barbon Manor Park, by permission of the Shuttleworth Estate.

The Barbon Inn, in the centre of the village, is a hotel, pub and restaurant built as a coaching inn in the 17th century.

Other sources
A family history study, written in 1913 called "The Hardys of Barbon, and some other Westmoreland Statesmen : Their Kith, Kin and Childer" follows their family history in Barbon from the 16th century until the late 19th century.

See also

Listed buildings in Barbon

References

External links
 
  Cumbria County History Trust: Barbon (nb: provisional research only - see Talk page)
 http://barbonvillage.co.uk/
 http://barbon.org.uk/
 

Yorkshire Dales National Park

Villages in Cumbria
South Lakeland District
Civil parishes in Cumbria
Yorkshire Dales